Elections for Cambridge City Council were held on Thursday 4 May 2006. As Cambridge City Council is elected by thirds, one seat in each of the city's 14 wards was up for election. The exception was Romsey, where two seats were up for election as a by-election for the other seat was held on the same day. Therefore, 15 of the 42 seats on the council were up for election. Overall turnout was 34.4%, down from 37.0% in 2004. The lowest turnout (28.4%) was in Abbey ward and the highest (40.8%) in Queen Edith's.

Results summary

Ward results

Abbey

Arbury

Castle

Cherry Hinton

Coleridge

East Chesterton

King's Hedges

Market

Newnham

Petersfield

Queen's Edith

Romsey

Trumpington

West Chesterton

Sources 
Cambridge City Council: Local election results
Cambridge City Council: 2006 local election full results
Cambridge City Election Results since 1945

See also 
Cambridge local elections
2006 United Kingdom local elections
Elections in the United Kingdom

2006 English local elections
2006
2000s in Cambridge